The following radio stations broadcast on AM frequency 710 kHz: 710 AM is a United States clear channel frequency. KIRO Seattle and WOR New York City share Class A status of 710 kHz.

In Argentina 
 LRL202 in Buenos Aires.
 LRA17	in Zapala, Neuquén
 LRA19 in Puerto Iguazú, Misiones

In Canada

In Mexico 
 XEDP-AM in Cd Cuauhtémoc, Chihuahua
 XEMAR-AM in Acapulco, Guerrero
 XEMP-AM in Mexico City
 XEOLA-AM in Ciudad Madero, Tamaulipas
 XESMR-AM in San Luis Potosí, San Luis Potosí

In the United States 
Stations in bold are clear-channel stations.

References

Lists of radio stations by frequency